Namaklan or Namak Kalan may refer to various villages in Iran:
Namak Alan
Namaklan-e Olya
Namaklan-e Sofla